The Kozhim is a river in Komi Republic, Russia that runs through the subpolar Ural Mountains. It is a tributary of the Kosyu, which is a tributary of the Usa.

See also
 List of rivers of Russia

References

External links
 A gold prospecting settlement by the kozhim river in komi, russia, 1990s (image). Diomedia.com.

Rivers of the Komi Republic